"Black Is Black" is a song recorded by Canadian country music artist Amanda Stott. It was released in 2000 as the first single from her debut album, Amanda Stott. It peaked at number 4 on the RPM Country Tracks chart in May 2000.

The song was covered by Beverley Mitchell on her self-titled debut album in 2007.

Chart performance

References

2000 songs
2000 debut singles
Amanda Stott songs
Songs written by Even Stevens (songwriter)
Warner Music Group singles